The Irish League in season 1904–05 comprised 8 teams, and Glentoran won the championship after a play-off with Belfast Celtic ( Championship Playoff: Glentoran-Belfast Celtic 3-1 ).

League standings

Results

References
Northern Ireland - List of final tables (RSSSF)

1904-05
Ireland
1904–05 in Irish association football